The 1998–99 Austrian Hockey League season was the 69th season of the Austrian Hockey League, the top level of ice hockey in Austria. Four teams participated in the league, and EC VSV won the championship.

Regular season

Playoffs

External links
Austrian Ice Hockey Association

Aus
1998–99 in Austrian ice hockey leagues
Austrian Hockey League seasons